Astata unicolor is a species of wasp in the family Crabronidae. It is found in Central America and North America.

References

Further reading

 

Crabronidae
Articles created by Qbugbot
Insects described in 1824